Brian Leslie Tarrant (born 22 July 1938) is an English former professional footballer who played in the Football League for Mansfield Town.

References

1938 births
Living people
English footballers
Association football forwards
English Football League players
Leeds United F.C. players
Mansfield Town F.C. players